Loon Lake is a wishbone-shaped body of water in Warren County, New York, USA. It is located within the Town of Chester, which maintains the beach. Fishing and boating are popular activities. Common fish species within the lake include pumpkinseed sunfish, walleye, rock bass, tiger muskie, yellow perch, smallmouth bass, largemouth bass, northern pike, bluegill, common rudd and brown bullhead. The lake has its own marina, where boats may launched and docked for a fee. It is possible to rent speedboats, pontoon boats, canoes and paddle boards. The marina has its own bait and tackle/quick mart. It is open from May to September. The marina is located off the lakes main road, Marina Road.

References

Lakes of New York (state)
Lakes of Warren County, New York
Reservoirs in New York (state)
U.S. Route 9
Tourist attractions in Warren County, New York
Reservoirs in Warren County, New York